Aglish, Ballinameela and Mount Stuart is a large parish in the Roman Catholic Diocese of Waterford and Lismore. It is situated the west of Dungarvan, County Waterford in Ireland. The parish comprises the villages of Aglish and Villierstown, plus the outlying areas of Ballinameela and Mount Stuart.

There are three Catholic churches within the parish: the Church of the Assumption (Aglish), the Church of St. James (Ballinameela; 1833), and Mount Stuart Church.

The three Catholic schools located within the parish are Aglish NS,  Whitechurch NS, and Villierstown NS.

Geography of County Waterford
Parishes of the Roman Catholic Diocese of Waterford and Lismore